Shahnaz Himmeti (died June 3, 2013) was an Afghan politician, who was the MP for Herat.

Death
On June 3, 2013, she died in a traffic collision.

References

1978 births
2013 deaths
Afghan politicians
Road incident deaths in Iran
Members of the House of the People (Afghanistan)